Skawinek  is a village in the administrative district of Gmina Bychawa, within Lublin County, Lublin Voivodeship, in eastern Poland.  In 1993, a small flood ruined a marginal amount of cropland.

References

Villages in Lublin County